Sillago caudicula is a species of marine fish in the smelt-whiting family Sillaginidae. It is found in Oman in the western Indian Ocean.

References

caudicula
Taxa named by Tatsuya Kaga
Taxa named by Hisashi Imamura 
Taxa named by Kazuhiro Nakaya
Fish described in 2010